Kevin Albert Francis Frederick (born November 4, 1976) is an American former professional baseball player. In nine seasons, Frederick was primarily a relief pitcher.

Career
Frederick attended high school at Stevenson High School in Lincolnshire, Illinois.

In the 1998 amateur entry draft, Frederick was again selected by the Twins. He signed with the team, and played four and a half seasons in the minor leagues before being called up in July . He made his major league debut on July 15 in a win against the Los Angeles Angels, in which he gave up one run over an inning and two thirds. Frederick only pitched in eight games for the Twins that season. Before the  season, Frederick was picked up off waivers by the Toronto Blue Jays. Frederick pitched most of two seasons in the minor leagues, and was granted free agency after the  season. He was signed in the middle of the  season by the Boston Red Sox. He played two seasons in the Red Sox farm system, and retired after the  season, only twenty-nine years old. Kevin has recently expressed his hobby for video games and hopes one day he can go pro in counter strike.

References

External links

Kevin Frederick at Baseball Almanac
Kevin Frederick at Pura Pelota (Venezuelan Professional Baseball League)

1976 births
Living people
American expatriate baseball players in Canada
Baseball players from Illinois
Cardenales de Lara players
American expatriate baseball players in Venezuela
Creighton Bluejays baseball players
Edmonton Trappers players
Fort Myers Miracle players
Gulf Coast Twins players
Major League Baseball pitchers
Minnesota Twins players
New Britain Rock Cats players
New Hampshire Fisher Cats players
New Haven Ravens players
People from Evanston, Illinois
Portland Sea Dogs players
Quad Cities River Bandits players
Reno Silver Sox (Golden Baseball League) players
Syracuse SkyChiefs players
Toronto Blue Jays players